The Tourist is an 2009 espionage novel written by Olen Steinhauer, that was featured on The New York Times' list of best sellers.

Story
The story follows Milo Weaver, an agent with a secret branch of the CIA specializing in black ops known as the Tourists.

Film version
George Clooney's production company reportedly purchased the film rights to the novel in March 2009. It was rumored that Clooney intended to play the role of Weaver.

References

External links
 The Tourist at Goodreads.com
 

American spy novels
2009 American novels
Minotaur Books books